Joanna Leszczyńska (born 18 December 1988 in Warsaw) is a Polish rower. At the 2012 Summer Olympics, she competed in the women's quadruple sculls. She won bronze medal in quadruple sculls at the 2016 Summer Olympics, with Maria Springwald, Agnieszka Kobus and Monika Ciaciuch.  That was also the team that won silver at the 2016 European Championships and bronze at the 2015 European Championships on home water in Poznan.

Leszczyńska had previously won bronze in the women's quadruple sculls at the 2013 World Championships with Sylwia Lewandowska, Magdalena Fularczyk and Natalia Madaj.

She had previously won European silver in 2012 in the quadruple sculls with Kamila Socko, Sylwia Lewandowska and Natalia Madaj.

See also 
Joanna Leszczyńska at World Rowing (under her married name of Joanna Hentka

References

Polish female rowers
1988 births
Living people
Olympic rowers of Poland
Rowers at the 2012 Summer Olympics
Rowers at the 2016 Summer Olympics
Rowers from Warsaw
Medalists at the 2016 Summer Olympics
Olympic bronze medalists for Poland
Olympic medalists in rowing
World Rowing Championships medalists for Poland
European Rowing Championships medalists